Chinnari Muddula Papa ( Cute Lovely Baby) is a 1990 Indian Telugu-language drama film produced by Vadde Ramesh under the Nalini Cini Creations banner and directed by Vaasi Reddy. It stars Jagapathi Babu, Sudhakar, Sivaji Raja, Kaveri  and music composed by S. P. Kodandapani Eeswar. The film is based on the Malayalam film Thoovalsparsham, which was inspired by the 1987 American film Three Men and a Baby, which itself was based on the 1985 French movie Three Men and a Cradle and later on remade in Tamil twice - as Thayamma and as Asathal and in Hindi as Heyy Babyy (2007).

Plot
The film begins with 3 happy bachelors Anand, Sudhakar, & Siva who share an apartment with frequent parties and flings. One day, a baby named Maya arrives on their doorstep with a note revealing she is the result of the perfidy of one of them. Then, Anand thinks back about his first love Sunita and they spent the night together. Later, Sunita misconstrues, loathes, and splits from Anand catching sight of his closeness with another girl. So, Anand declares Maya as his child. Accordingly, it forlorn the men to take care of the baby and attempts to dispose of her but fail as they are strongly correlated. Parallelly as a glimpse, Sudhakar & Siva love their neighbors Shanti a modern girl & Jyoti a widow respectively. Aside from this, a dreadful gangster Johnson smuggles precious diamonds on time which struck at Maya's cradle, and they back her. 

Once Maya is ailing due to a heart problem and must be operated on soon. Hence, to raise the amount Anand donates his kidney and rescues her. Meanwhile, Sunita arrives and apologizes to Anand through whom he is aware that Maya is not their daughter. Despite that, he accepts Maya as his own. After a few disarrays, Maya's real parents Prasad & Lakshmi land. Indeed, the pair resided in the same flat previously as the 3 men and they have been divided because of ego. Further, Lakshmi left Maya in front of the flat misinterpreting that her husband is still hanging on therein. Simultaneously, Maya is abducted by Johnson when the 3 safeguard her by ceasing him. Now, the 3 besties must forcibly hand over the baby to her parents with grief. The next day, Prasad shifts to a plot in the apartment as the three friends are emotionally connected with his daughter.

Cast
Jagapati Babu as Anand
Sudhakar as Sudhakar
Kaveri as Sunita
Sivaji Raja as Shivaji
Kota Srinivasa Rao as Patel
Pradeep Shakthi as Anand's father
Raja as Maya's father
R. V. Prasad as Johnson
Bhimeswara Rao as a doctor
Kallu Chidambaram as photographer
Rajitha as Jyoti
Disco Shanti as Shanti
Sandhya as Jyoti's mother
Lakshmi Priya as Anand's mother
Baby Sowjanya as Maya

Soundtrack

Music composed by S. P. Kodandapani Eeswar. Music released on AVM Audio Company.

References

External links 

1990 films
1990s Telugu-language films
Indian romantic comedy films
Indian comedy-drama films
Indian buddy comedy films
1990s romantic comedy films
1990s comedy-drama films
1990s buddy comedy films
Films about babies
Films about parenting
Indian remakes of French films
Telugu remakes of Malayalam films